Edward Desh Karanja (born 25 Jan 1974) is a retired Kenyan midfielder who turned out for Kenyan Premier League sides Tusker F.C., World Hope FC and Kenya. He turned to coaching after retirement.

Early life
Edward was born in Kawangware, Nairobi County, and schooled at the Nduraru Primary before joining Rungiri Secondary School.

Career
Edward started out at Kawangware Sports Club before joining A.F.C. Leopards in 1995. He then moved to Kenya Breweries F.C. in 1996 but before he could settle he was off to Oman where he featured for Fanja SC the same year. 

He was back at Tusker F.C. in 1997 and featured for the side for seven years till the year 2003 when he moved to newly formed World Hope FC. He left the club after featuring in a few games following the club's promotion to the Kenyan Premier League in 2004.

Coaching
Karanja has been to the National team fold as coach at the U19, U20 and U23 level. He has also coached several teams after his retirement which includes National Youth Talent Academy in 2011, second tier sides MOYAS (MOSCA) and FC Talanta, and lower tier side Boma FC in 2014. 

In 2016 he coached Somalia's top tier side Banadir FC. He is the current coach of Kenyan third tier side Liberty Professionals.

International career
Karanja was first capped for Kenya on 21 Apr 1997 by coach Reinhard Fabisch in an international friendly against Iran at Takhti Stadium (Tabriz). His first competitive game was away to DR Congo on 24 Jan 1999 during 2000 African Cup of Nations qualification held at the Stade des Martyrs. 

He scored his only international goal in a friendly against Tanzania on 23 March 2003 in a 4-0 win at the Moi International Sports Centre. Karanja was part of the squad that lifted the 2002 Castle Cup at the Uhuru Stadium, Dar es Salaam, and the 2002 CECAFA Cup at the CCM Kirumba Stadium in Mwanza. He earned a total of 13 national caps.

Career statistics

International

International goals
 (scores and results list Kenya's goal tally first)

Honours

Club
Tusker
 Kenyan Premier League: 1999
 Kenyan Premier League: 2000
 Kagame Interclub Cup: 2000
 Kagame Interclub Cup: 2001
World Hope
  KFF Nationwide League: 2003
Kenya
 2002 CECAFA Cup
 Castle Lager Cup (East Africa): 2002

References

External links
 
Edward Karanja at Football Database

Living people
1974 births
Kenyan footballers
Association football midfielders
Fanja SC players
Nairobi City Stars players
Kenyan Premier League players
People from Central Province (Kenya)